Granieri is an Italian surname. Notable people with the surname include:

Giovanna Granieri (born 1974), Italian basketball player
Nicola Granieri (1942–2006), Italian fencer

See also
Ranieri

Italian-language surnames